The Lukšić Cabinet, led by Igor Lukšić, is the 39th cabinet of the Montenegro.
The cabinet was elected on 29 December 2010 by a majority vote in Montenegrin Parliament. It succeeded the sixth cabinet of Milo Đukanović. formed after the 2009 parliamentary election, after Đukanović resigned the prime minister. The coalition government was composed of the Democratic Party of Socialists (DPS), the Social Democratic Party (SDP), and ethnic minority parties.

History

Đukanović resignation
Due to international controversies around him, the premiership of Milo Đukanović was seen as a major obstacle in the EU integration path of Montenegro. He eventually resigned four days after Montenegro was given official candidate status on 21 December 2010.

New government election
The DPS unanimously nominated Deputy Prime Minister Igor Lukšić as Đukanović's successor. The Parliament of Montenegro took a final vote on the matter on 29 December 2010. The cabinet comprised ministers from the Democratic Party of Socialists (DPS), Social Democratic Party (SDP), Bosniak Party (BS) and Democratic Union of Albanians (DUA). It consists mostly of the same ministers from the previous Đukanović cabinet.

Cabinet composition

See also
Igor Lukšić
Government of Montenegro

References

Government of Montenegro
Cabinets established in 2010